Dave Matthews & Friends is an American jam band that was put together for a tour to support Dave Matthews' solo debut, Some Devil.  Most of the musicians participated in the album's production. The band consists of:
 Dave Matthews – rhythm guitar, lead vocals
 Trey Anastasio – lead guitar, vocals
 Tim Reynolds – lead guitar
  Tony Hall – bass guitar
 Brady Blade – drums, backing vocals
 Ray Paczkowski – keyboard

History
Several members of the band have long histories playing together. Matthews and Reynolds met in the 1980s at Miller's in Charlottesville, Virginia, where Matthews was a bartender and Reynolds and his band TR3 played on a regular basis. Matthews and Anastasio first played together on February 5, 1993 at Warren Haynes's Ritz Power Jam, where DMB, Haynes, Anastasio, and John Popper performed "All Along the Watchtower" together. Paczkowski and Anastasio met in Burlington, Vermont and have been playing together in Anastasio's various solo projects since 2001. Tony Hall later joined Anastasio's solo band, Trey Anastasio Band (formerly 70 Volt Parade), in 2005.

The band came together as guests on Matthews' debut solo album, Some Devil, and, after its release, went on a 12-stop tour in the winter of 2003 and 2004. The band made its public debut as the musical guest on the November 8, 2003, edition of Saturday Night Live, performing "Save Me" and "So Damn Lucky".

Dave Matthews & Friends have also performed at the Bonnaroo music and arts festival on June 11, 2004, the Vegoose music and arts festival on October 29, 2005, and also headlined a 3-day cruise in February 2006.

Music
The live shows of Dave Matthews & Friends consist of two to three different segments.
Most shows open with just Dave Matthews and Tim Reynolds on acoustic guitars, playing Dave Matthews Band songs, similar to their past acoustic tours together. This is followed by an Intermission.
The majority of the performance (after intermission) has the full band playing songs from Some Devil, as well as some cover tunes, including Paul Simon's "American Tune", Peter Gabriel's "Solsbury Hill", and Led Zeppelin's "Fool in the Rain". One particular song the band has embraced, "Sweet Up and Down", was from the unreleased Lillywhite Sessions that was only played a few times by DMB early in their 2000 tour, and was not among the majority of the sessions' songs re-recorded for 2002's Busted Stuff. During the Dave Matthews Band 2007 Summer Tour, "Sweet Up and Down" returned to full band rotation after being played by Dave & Friends.
The third segment, not done at every performance, features Dave Matthews and Trey Anastasio on acoustic guitars, with Matthews playing a DMB song (usually "Everyday") and Anastasio performing a Phish song (usually "Bathtub Gin"), with the two singers singing verses from each other's songs. Sometimes, this segment also included a performance of the Phish song "Waste," which Matthews had previously covered during his solo encore spot at DMB's performances.

Tour Dates

References

Dave Matthews